M. arborea may refer to:
 Medicago arborea, the moon trefoil, shrub medick, alfalfa arborea or tree medick, a plant species found throughout Europe and especially in the Mediterranean basin
 Myrica arborea, a plant species endemic to Equatorial Guinea

See also 
 Arborea (disambiguation)